Adam Chętnik (born December 20, 1885, in Nowogród, died May 29, 1967, in Warsaw) was a Polish ethnographer who studied the Kurpie. He is the author of several books on the Kurpie residing in Puszcza Zielona. In 1927 he founded Skansen Kurpiowski in Nowogród, an open-air museum dedicated to Kurpie culture. He published over 100 scholarly works. He was also an elected deputy to the Sejm, as well as a member of the Polish Academy of Learning.

Works
 Puszcza Kurpiowska, 1913
 Chata Kurpiowska, 1915
 Życie Puszczańskie Kurpiów
 Mazurskim szlakiem, 1939
 monografie Nowogrodu, Myszyńca, Dąbrówki, Opęchowa.
 Kurpie
 Z Kurpiowskich obozów
 Obrazki i gadki
 Krótki przewodnik po Kurpiach
 Kalendarzyk zwyczajów i obrzędów ludu kurpiowskiego
 O bursztynie i przemyśle bursztyniarskim

References
 Wrota Podlasia - Adam Chętnik
 Publiczna Szkoła Podstawowa im. Adama Chętnika w Jednorożcu
 Marian Pokropek, Adam Chętnik - badacz Kurpiowszczyzny, Ostrołęckie Towarzystwo Naukowe, Muzeum Okręgowe w Ostrołęce, 1992

External links
 Związek Kurpiów - Adam Chętnik

1885 births
1967 deaths
People from Łomża County
People from Łomża Governorate
Popular National Union politicians
Members of the Sejm of the Second Polish Republic (1922–1927)
Polish ethnographers
Members of the Polish Academy of Learning
Officers of the Order of Polonia Restituta
Knights of the Order of Polonia Restituta
Recipients of the Gold Cross of Merit (Poland)